Manny Perry is an American stunt coordinator and stuntman. He has performed in dozens of films including Armageddon, Con Air, and The Mighty Ducks. He played the role of Big Jim Slade in Kentucky Fried Movie. He has also had acting roles as a policeman in the TV series 24 and a terrorist henchman in the Jean-Claude Van Damme movie Sudden Death.

Selected filmography
 The Kentucky Fried Movie (1977) as Jim 'Big Jim' Slade (segments "Sex Record" & "Fistful of Yen")
 Cracking Up (1983) as Slavdriver
 Number One with a Bullet (1987) as Bodyguard At DeCosta's
 Terminal Exposure (1987) as Black Giant
 Who's Harry Crumb? (1989) as Cop In Car
 Marked for Death (1990) as Screwface's Jamaican Posse (uncredited)
 Predator 2 (1990) as King Willie Gang Member (uncredited)
 Out for Justice (1991) as King's Bouncer (uncredited)
 The Naked Gun 2½: The Smell of Fear (1991) as Jock #2
 The Last Boy Scout (1991) as Cigar Thug
 Stop! Or My Mom Will Shoot (1992) as Bad Guy
 American Me (1992) as Arthur J., Member of The Black Guerilla Family
 Nowhere to Run (1993) as Prisoner
 Loaded Weapon 1 (1993) as General Mortars Goon Squad (uncredited)
 Best of the Best II (1993) as Gunman In Desert
 True Lies (1994) as Bass Player (uncredited)
 Bad Boys (1995) as Drug Buyer Gunmen (uncredited)
 Panther (1995) as 'Shorty'
 Under Siege 2: Dark Territory (1995) as Mercenary (uncredited)
 Sudden Death (1995) as Brody
 Heat (1995) as Grocery Store Cop (uncredited)
 For Which He Stands (1996) as Cecil
 Fire Down Below (1997) as FBI Agent (uncredited)
 Rush Hour (1998) as Bartender
 Gun Shy (2000) as Cheemo's Bodyguard
 Collateral Damage (2002) as FBI Agent (uncredited)
 Eagle Eye (2008) as Sectran Courier

References

External links

Perry, Manny
Living people
Year of birth missing (living people)